Sverdrup & Parcel was an American civil engineering company formed in  1928 by Leif J. Sverdrup and his college engineering professor John I. Parcel.  The company worked primarily in a specialty field of bridges. The company's headquarters was located in St. Louis, Missouri.  

The firm was the designer of the ill-fated I-35W Mississippi River bridge, Minneapolis, Minnesota, 1964 (collapsed on August 1, 2007).  The official report by the National Transportation Safety Board blamed the bridge collapse on a design error by the firm, resulting in the gusset plates having inadequate load capacity.

Some other well-known projects of Sverdrup & Parcel include:
 Amelia Earhart Bridge 1939, Atchison, Kansas
 Sidney Lanier Bridge 1956, Brunswick, Georgia
 Bridge of the Americas 1962 (also known as Puente de las Américas, Thatcher Ferry Bridge), Panama, crosses the Panama Canal
 Chesapeake Bay Bridge-Tunnel, (also known as Lucius J. Kellam, Jr. Bridge-Tunnel) completed in 1964, and named one of the "Seven Engineering Wonders of the Modern World" shortly thereafter.
 Busch Memorial Stadium 1966, St. Louis, Missouri 
Hearnes Center, 1972, Columbia, Missouri
 Puente de Angostura Bolivar, Venezuela, crosses the Orinoco River
 Louisiana Superdome, New Orleans, Louisiana, 1975
Monitor-Merrimac Memorial Bridge-Tunnel, 1992, in Newport News, Virginia

Sverdrup & Parcel was succeeded by Sverdrup Civil, which in 1999 was part of the merger between Sverdrup and Jacobs Engineering.

References

External links
 Jacobs Engineering website

Defunct companies based in Missouri
Construction and civil engineering companies of the United States 
Construction and civil engineering companies established in 1928 
American companies established in 1928 
Engineering consulting firms of the United States
1928 establishments in Missouri